Aakhir Kaun Thi Woh? is a Hindi horror romantic film of Bollywood directed by Bappu and produced by Avtar Ahluwalia. This film was released in 2000 under the banner of Bapu Arts International. Lead singers of the movie were Mohammad Aziz, Asha Bhosle, Sonu Nigam and Suresh Wadekar.

Plot
The horror movie is about a female ghost who is on a hunt to find her revenge.

Cast
 Raj Babbar
 Sadashiv Amrapurkar as V P Sinha
 Raza Murad as Police commissioner/Defence Lawyer
 Jyoti Rana
 Sripradha
 Anil Kochar
 Jitendra Bhardwaj
 Rakshta Mehta
 Jr. Mehmood
 Mashail Khan
 Kiran Randhawa
 Rajendra Kaur

References

External links
 

2000 films
2000s Hindi-language films
Indian romantic horror films
2000 horror films